Attila Henrik Szabó (born January 31, 1970) is a Hungarian born writer, translator, television and radio journalist, producer, communications expert.

Life
Attila Henrik Szabó was born in Budapest. He graduated from the University of Debrecen in 1994. He taught English language at a Budapest city highschool and a popular private language school for over three years. He studied translation and interpretation from Istvan Geher at Hungary's leading university, ELTE from 1994 to 1996. He completed the Hungarian Radio course in Radio Journalism and the BBC World Service course in Television and Radio Journalism and Basic Broadcast Techniques in 1996. He worked as an editor at the Hungarian Radio then he secured a job with the Hungarian Television. Soon  after the first Hungarian commercial television channels were established in 1997 he became a producer at TV2 (Hungary), the first commercial terrestrial channel available. He published several articles and books of many genres. He worked for Weber Shandwick, England's leading PR agency from 2008 to 2011. He translated television series (Discovery Channel, Discovery Science, Discovery World) from English into Hungarian. He is an author of several popular books in Hungary. In 2012 he moved to the UK and lives there with his family.

Media career
 Népszabadság (Peoples' Freefom) (1995–1997) – political daily, journalist
 168 óra (168 Hours) (1995–1997) – political weekly, journalist
 Szonda (The Probe, Hungarian Radio) (1995–1998) – science, editor
 Mindennapi Tudomány (Every Day Science, Hungarian Radio) (1995–1998) – science, editor
 Krónika (Chronicles, Hungarian Radio) (1995–1998) – news, editor
 Reggeli csúcs (Morning Peak, Hungarian Radio) (1995–1996) – news, editor
 Tudományos Híradó (Science News, Hungarian Television) (1996–1998) – science news, editor
 Híradó (Evening News, Hungarian Television) (1996–1998) – news, editor
 Delta (Delta, Hungarian Television) (1996–1998) – science, editor
 Repeta (Repeat IT, Hungarian Television) (1996–1998) – education, editor
 Mélyvíz (Deep Water, Hungarian Television) (1996–1998) – talk show, editor
 Miénk itt a tér (This Place Is Ours, Duna TV) (1996–1998) – education, editor 
 A-Z tudományos magazin (A-Z Science News, TV2 (Hungary)) (1997–1998) – science, editor
 Tények (Evening News, TV2) (1997–1999) – news, editor
 Klik informatikai magazin (Click, TV2) (1997–1998) – IT magazine, editor
 Kuk@c informatikai magazin (@, TV2 (Hungary)) (1997–1998) – IT magazine, producer
 Háló@Világ informatikai magazin (Web@World, TV2 (Hungary)) (1999–2001) – IT magazine, producer
 ModemIdők (Modem Times, Hungarian Radio) (1999) – IT magazine, producer 
 InfoKrónika (InfoChronicles, Hungarian Radio) (1999) – IT news, producer
 Jó reggelt, Magyarország! (Good Morning Hungary, TV2 (Hungary)) (2000) – news, producer
 Informatikai Híradó (IT News, Hungarian Television) (2005) – news, producer

Public relations
 Media and crisis management trainings for company executives from 1998
 Weber Shandwick (2008–2010) – Senior Advisor, Head of Media and Creative

Translations
 Poems (1998–)
 Books (1998–)
 Television series and one offs (Science) (Discovery Channel, Discovery World, Discovery Science) from English into Hungarian (2011–)

Awards, memberships
 Joseph Pulitzer Memorial Award, (1998) Radio Journalist, Hungarian Radio
 Member of the British Mensa

Books published
 Idézetek könyve (Big Book of Quotes) (1998) – 400 pages
 Idézetek könyve (Big Book of Quotes) (2002) – 399 pages, 
 Nagy emberek nagy mondásai (Great Sayings from Great Men) (2009) – 208 pages, 
 Öreg néne Győzikéje, válogatott celebmesék (Celebrity Tales) (2011) – 168 pages,

Sources
 Kreatív Magazin (Creative, marketing magazine)
 Attila Henrik Szabó's resume on Prezi
 Article, Weborvos (WebDoctor) 
 Magyarul Bábelben (Hungarian Tower of Babel) – poems translated by Attila Henrik Szabó
 Dokk.hu – Attila Henrik Szabó
 Index.hu
 Weebly

Other relevant information
 Celeb 24 – Öreg néne Győzikéje (Celebrity Tales)
 Attila Henrik Szabó's Books
 Libri Aranykönyv (Libri Golden Book Award) 2011
 Comedy Central

1970 births
Living people
Hungarian journalists
Hungarian male writers
Hungarian producers
Hungarian translators